Bojan Ropret (born 17 August 1957) is a former Slovene cyclist. He competed for Yugoslavia at the 1976, 1980 and 1984 Summer Olympics.

References

External links
 

1957 births
Living people
Slovenian male cyclists
Olympic cyclists of Yugoslavia
Cyclists at the 1976 Summer Olympics
Cyclists at the 1980 Summer Olympics
Cyclists at the 1984 Summer Olympics
Sportspeople from Kranj